Jeremy Peter Varon (born 1967) is an American historian. He is a professor of history at the New School for Social Research and Eugene Lang College. He is the author of the books, Bringing the War Home: The Weather Underground, the Red Army Faction, and Revolutionary Violence in the Sixties and Seventies (2004) and The New Life: The Jewish Students of Postwar Germany (2014). He cofounded and coedits The Sixties: A Journal of History, Politics, and Culture, an academic journal published by Taylor & Francis.

Varon completed a B.A. in History at Brown University in 1989. He earned a M.A. (1995) and Ph.D. (1998) in History at Cornell University, under doctoral advisor Dominick LaCapra.

Varon was a historian at Drew University.

References

External links

21st-century American historians
Living people
Brown University alumni
Cornell University alumni
Drew University faculty
Eugene Lang College The New School for Liberal Arts faculty
Place of birth missing (living people)
1967 births
21st-century American male writers